The 1932 Duke Blue Devils football team was an American football team that represented Duke University during the 1932 Southern Conference football season. In its second season under head coach Wallace Wade, the team compiled a 7–3 record (5–3 against conference opponents), shut out seven opponents, and outscored all opponents by a total of 153 to 40.  Lowell Mason was the team captain. The team played its home games at Duke Stadium in Durham, North Carolina.

Schedule

References

Duke
Duke Blue Devils football seasons
Duke Blue Devils football